Michael Calvert Warren (born 1964) is a Pitcairnese politician, who was Mayor of the Pitcairn Islands from 2008 to 2013.

Child pornography 
In December 2010, Warren was charged with possessing indecent photos of children and possessing pornographic images, videos and documents involving children. Warren fought to have his case tried in Pitcairn; Crown prosecutors sought to try him in New Zealand. His application was rejected in a hearing held in May 2012, whilst still in office.

In 2016, Warren was found guilty of downloading more than 1,000 images and videos of child sexual abuse. During the time he downloaded the images he was working in child protection. Warren began downloading the images after six male residents on the island, including the then mayor, were found guilty during the Pitcairn sexual assault trial of 2004. Warren was also convicted of engaging in a "sex chat" with someone who he believed was a 15-year-old girl.

In 2018, the Privy Council refused a bid for appeal, saying that Warren's attempt to appeal using constitutional grounds was an abuse of process.

Indecency conviction

In October 2020 Warren was arrested on three charges of indecent behaviour in a public place, after being accused of walking around the island naked on multiple occasions, including walks through its central square and past its church. In December 2021, he was found guilty of the charges and fined $150. As part of their investigation, police found additional images of Warren walking around the island naked between 2001 and 2010.

References 

1964 births
British politicians convicted of crimes
Living people
Mayors of the Pitcairn Islands
People convicted of child pornography offenses
Pitcairn Islands people of American descent
Pitcairn Islands people of British descent
Pitcairn Islands people of Polynesian descent
Pitcairn Islands people of Saint Kitts and Nevis descent
Pitcairn Islands Seventh-day Adventists
Politicians convicted of sex offences
Prisoners and detainees of the United Kingdom
Sex offenders from British Overseas Territories
Heads of government who were later imprisoned